John Maurice Tanner (11 January 1927 – 5 October 2020) was a New Zealand rugby union player. A second five-eighth and three-quarter, Tanner represented Otago and Auckland at a provincial level, and was a member of the New Zealand national side, the All Blacks, from 1950 to 1954. He played 24 matches for the All Blacks, including five internationals, and captained the team on two occasions.

Tanner died in Auckland on 5 October 2020.

References

1927 births
2020 deaths
Rugby union players from Auckland
People educated at Auckland Grammar School
University of Otago alumni
New Zealand rugby union players
New Zealand international rugby union players
Otago rugby union players
Auckland rugby union players
Rugby union centres
Rugby union wings
New Zealand dentists